Myiotrixini is a tribe of flies in the family Tachinidae from Australia.

Genera
Myiotrixa Brauer & Bergenstamm, 1893
Obscuromyia Barraclough & O'Hara, 1998

References

Tachininae
Diptera of Australasia
Brachycera tribes